Peter Ware Higgs  (born 29 May 1929) is a British theoretical physicist, Emeritus Professor in the University of Edinburgh, and Nobel Prize laureate for his work on the mass of subatomic particles.

In the 1960s, Higgs proposed that broken symmetry in electroweak theory could explain the origin of mass of elementary particles in general and of the W and Z bosons in particular. This so-called Higgs mechanism, which was proposed by several physicists besides Higgs at about the same time, predicts the existence of a new particle, the Higgs boson, the detection of which became one of the great goals of physics. On 4 July 2012, CERN announced the discovery of the boson at the Large Hadron Collider. The Higgs mechanism is generally accepted as an important ingredient in the Standard Model of particle physics, without which certain particles would have no mass.

Higgs has been honoured with a number of awards in recognition of his work, including the 1981 Hughes Medal from the Royal Society; the 1984 Rutherford Medal from the Institute of Physics; the 1997 Dirac Medal and Prize for outstanding contributions to theoretical physics from the Institute of Physics; the 1997 High Energy and Particle Physics Prize by the European Physical Society; the 2004 Wolf Prize in Physics; the 2009 Oskar Klein Memorial Lecture medal from the Royal Swedish Academy of Sciences; the 2010 American Physical Society J. J. Sakurai Prize for Theoretical Particle Physics; and a unique Higgs Medal from the Royal Society of Edinburgh in 2012. The discovery of the Higgs boson prompted fellow physicist Stephen Hawking to note that he thought that Higgs should receive the Nobel Prize in Physics for his work, which he finally did, shared with François Englert in 2013. Higgs was appointed to the Order of the Companions of Honour in the 2013 New Year Honours and in 2015 the Royal Society awarded him the Copley Medal, the world's oldest scientific prize.

Early life and education
Higgs was born in the Elswick district of Newcastle upon Tyne, England, to Thomas Ware Higgs (1898–1962) and his wife Gertrude Maude née Coghill (1895–1969). His father worked as a sound engineer for the BBC, and as a result of childhood asthma, together with the family moving around because of his father's job and later World War II, Higgs missed some early schooling and was taught at home. When his father relocated to Bedford, Higgs stayed behind in Bristol with his mother, and was largely raised there. He attended Cotham Grammar School in Bristol from 1941–46, where he was inspired by the work of one of the school's alumni, Paul Dirac, a founder of the field of quantum mechanics.

In 1946, at the age of 17, Higgs moved to City of London School, where he specialised in mathematics, then in 1947 to King's College London where he graduated with a first class honours degree in Physics in 1950 and achieved a master's degree in 1952. He was awarded an 1851 Research Fellowship from the Royal Commission for the Exhibition of 1851, and performed his doctoral research in molecular physics under the supervision of Charles Coulson and Christopher Longuet-Higgins. He was awarded a PhD degree in 1954 with a thesis entitled Some problems in the theory of molecular vibrations from King's College London.

Career and research
After finishing his doctorate, Higgs was appointed a Senior Research Fellow at the University of Edinburgh (1954–56). He then held various posts at Imperial College London, and University College London (where he also became a temporary lecturer in Mathematics). He returned to the University of Edinburgh in 1960 to take up the post of Lecturer at the Tait Institute of Mathematical Physics, allowing him to settle in the city he had enjoyed while hitchhiking to the Western Highlands as a student in 1949. He was promoted to Reader, became a Fellow of the Royal Society of Edinburgh (FRSE) in 1974 and was promoted to a Personal Chair of Theoretical Physics in 1980. He retired in 1996 and became Emeritus professor at the University of Edinburgh.

Higgs was elected Fellow of the Royal Society (FRS) in 1983 and Fellow of the Institute of Physics (FInstP) in 1991. He was awarded the Rutherford Medal and Prize in 1984. He received an honorary degree from the University of Bristol in 1997. In 2008 he received an Honorary Fellowship from Swansea University for his work in particle physics.

At Edinburgh Higgs first became interested in mass, developing the idea that particles – massless when the universe began – acquired mass a fraction of a second later as a result of interacting with a theoretical field (which became known as the Higgs field). Higgs postulated that this field permeates space, giving mass to all elementary subatomic particles that interact with it.

The Higgs mechanism postulates the existence of the Higgs field which confers mass on quarks and leptons. However this causes only a tiny portion of the masses of other subatomic particles, such as protons and neutrons. In these, gluons that bind quarks together confer most of the particle mass.

The original basis of Higgs' work came from the Japanese-born theorist and Nobel Prize laureate Yoichiro Nambu from the University of Chicago. Professor Nambu had proposed a theory known as spontaneous symmetry breaking based on what was known to happen in superconductivity in condensed matter; however, the theory predicted massless particles (the Goldstone's theorem), a clearly incorrect prediction.

Higgs is reported to have developed the fundamentals of his theory after returning to his Edinburgh New Town apartment from a failed weekend camping trip to the Highlands. He stated that there was no "eureka moment" in the development of the theory. He wrote a short paper exploiting a loophole in Goldstone's theorem (massless Goldstone particles need not occur when local symmetry is spontaneously broken in a relativistic theory) and published it in Physics Letters, a European physics journal edited at CERN, in Switzerland, in 1964.

Higgs wrote a second paper describing a theoretical model (now called the Higgs mechanism), but the paper was rejected (the editors of Physics Letters judged it "of no obvious relevance to physics"). Higgs wrote an extra paragraph and sent his paper to Physical Review Letters, another leading physics journal, which published it later in 1964. This paper predicted a new massive spin-zero boson (now known as the Higgs boson).
Other physicists, Robert Brout and François Englert and Gerald Guralnik, C. R. Hagen and Tom Kibble
had reached similar conclusions about the same time. In the published version Higgs quotes Brout and Englert and the third paper quotes the previous ones. The three papers written on this boson discovery by Higgs, Guralnik, Hagen, Kibble, Brout, and Englert were each recognised as milestone papers by Physical Review Letters 50th anniversary celebration. While each of these famous papers took similar approaches, the contributions and differences between the 1964 PRL symmetry breaking papers are noteworthy. The mechanism had been proposed in 1962 by Philip Anderson although he did not include a crucial relativistic model.

On 4 July 2012, CERN announced the ATLAS and Compact Muon Solenoid (CMS) experiments had seen strong indications for the presence of a new particle, which could be the Higgs boson, in the mass region around 126 gigaelectronvolts (GeV).
Speaking at the seminar in Geneva, Higgs commented "It's really an incredible thing that it's happened in my lifetime." Ironically, this probable confirmation of the Higgs boson was made at the same place where the editor of Physics Letters rejected Higgs' paper.

Awards and honours
Higgs has received numerous accolades including:

Civic awards

Higgs was the recipient of the Edinburgh Award for 2011. He is the fifth person to receive the Award, which was established in 2007 by the City of Edinburgh Council to honour an outstanding individual who has made a positive impact on the city and gained national and international recognition for Edinburgh.

Higgs was presented with an engraved loving cup by the Rt Hon George Grubb, Lord Provost of Edinburgh, in a ceremony held at the City Chambers on Friday 24 February 2012. The event also marked the unveiling of his handprints in the City Chambers quadrangle, where they had been engraved in Caithness stone alongside those of previous Edinburgh Award recipients.

Higgs was awarded with the Freedom of the City of Bristol in July 2013. In April 2014, he was also awarded the Freedom of the City of Newcastle upon Tyne. He was also honoured with a brass plaque installed on the Newcastle Quayside as part of the Newcastle Gateshead Initiative Local Heroes Walk of Fame.

Higgs Centre for Theoretical Physics
On 6 July 2012, Edinburgh University announced a new centre named after Professor Higgs to support future research in theoretical physics. The Higgs Centre for Theoretical Physics brings together scientists from around the world to seek "a deeper understanding of how the universe works". The centre is currently based within the James Clerk Maxwell Building, home of the University's School of Physics and Astronomy and the iGEM 2015 team (ClassAfiED). The university has also established a chair of theoretical physics in the name of Peter Higgs.

Nobel Prize in Physics
On 8 October 2013, it was announced that Higgs and François Englert would share the 2013 Nobel Prize in Physics "for the theoretical discovery of a mechanism that contributes to our understanding of the origin of mass of subatomic particles", and which recently was confirmed through the discovery of the predicted fundamental particle, by the ATLAS and CMS experiments at CERN’s Large Hadron Collider". Higgs admits he had gone out to avoid the media attention so he was informed he had been awarded the prize by an ex-neighbour on his way home, since he did not have a mobile phone.

Companion of Honour 
Higgs turned down a knighthood in 1999, but in 2012 he accepted membership of The Order of the Companion of Honour. He later said that he only accepted the order because he was wrongly assured that the award was the gift of the Queen alone. He also expressed cynicism towards the honours system, and the way the system "is used for political purposes by the government in power". The order confers no title or precedence, but recipients of the order are entitled to use the post-nominal letters . In the same interview he also stated that when people ask what the  after his name stands for, he replies "it means I'm an honorary Swiss." He received the order from the Queen at an investiture at Holyrood House on 1 July 2014.

Honorary Degrees
 
Higgs has been awarded honorary degrees from the following institutions:

 DSc University of Bristol 1997
 DSc University of Edinburgh 1998
 DSc University of Glasgow 2002
 DSc Swansea University 2008
 DSc King's College London 2009
 DSc University College London 2010
 DSc University of Cambridge 2012
 DSc Heriot-Watt University 2012
 PhD SISSA, Trieste 2013
 DSc University of Durham 2013
 DSc University of Manchester 2013
 DSc University of St Andrews 2014
 DSc Free University of Brussels (ULB) 2014
 DSc University of North Carolina at Chapel Hill 2015
 DSc Queen's University Belfast 2015
 ScD Trinity College Dublin 2016

A portrait of Higgs was painted by Ken Currie in 2008. Commissioned by the University of Edinburgh, it was unveiled on 3 April 2009 and hangs in the entrance of the James Clerk Maxwell Building of the School of Physics and Astronomy and the School of Mathematics. A large portrait by Lucinda Mackay is in the collection of the Scottish National Portrait Gallery in Edinburgh. Another portrait of Higgs by the same artist hangs in the birthplace of James Clerk Maxwell in Edinburgh, Higgs is the Honorary Patron of the James Clerk Maxwell Foundation.  A portrait by Victoria Crowe was commissioned by the Royal Society of Edinburgh and unveiled in 2013.

Personal life and political views
Higgs married Jody Williamson, a fellow activist with the Campaign for Nuclear Disarmament (CND) in 1963. Their first son was born in August 1965. Higgs's family includes two sons: Chris, a computer scientist, and Jonny, a jazz musician. He has two grandchildren. The entire family lives in Edinburgh.

Higgs was an activist in the CND while in London and later in Edinburgh, but resigned his membership when the group extended its remit from campaigning against nuclear weapons to campaigning against nuclear power too. He was a Greenpeace member until the group opposed genetically modified organisms.

Higgs was awarded the 2004 Wolf Prize in Physics (sharing it with Robert Brout and François Englert), but he refused to fly to Jerusalem to receive the award because it was a state occasion attended by the then president of Israel, Moshe Katsav, and Higgs was opposed to Israel's actions in Palestine.

Higgs was actively involved in the Edinburgh University branch of the Association of University Teachers, through which he agitated for greater staff involvement in the management of the physics department.

Higgs is an atheist. He has described Richard Dawkins as having adopted a "fundamentalist" view of non-atheists. Higgs has expressed displeasure with the nickname the "God particle". Although it has been reported that he believes the term "might offend people who are religious", Higgs has stated that this is not the case, lamenting the letters he has received which claim the God particle was predicted in the Torah, the Qur'an and Buddhist scriptures. In a 2013 interview with Decca Aitkenhead, Higgs was quoted as saying:

Usually this nickname for the Higgs boson is attributed to Leon Lederman, the author of the book The God Particle: If the Universe Is the Answer, What Is the Question?, but the name is the result of the suggestion of Lederman's publisher: Lederman had originally intended to refer to it as the "goddamn particle".

References

External links

 
 Google Scholar List of Papers by PW Higgs
 BBC profile of Peter Higgs
 The god of small things – An interview with Peter Higgs in The Guardian
 My Life as a Boson – A Lecture by Peter Higgs available in various formats
 Physical Review Letters – 50th Anniversary Milestone Papers
 In CERN Courier, Steven Weinberg reflects on spontaneous symmetry breaking
 Physics World, Introducing the little Higgs
 Englert-Brout-Higgs-Guralnik-Hagen-Kibble Mechanism on Scholarpedia
 History of Englert-Brout-Higgs-Guralnik-Hagen-Kibble Mechanism on Scholarpedia
 Sakurai Prize Videos
 «I wish they hadn't dubbed it "The God Particle"» Interview with Peter Higgs
 Peter Higgs: I wouldn't be productive enough for today's academic system
  including the Nobel Lecture on 8 December 2013 Evading the Goldstone Theorem 

1929 births
Academics of University College London
Academics of the University of Edinburgh
Alumni of the University of London
Alumni of King's College London
Living people
British Nobel laureates
English atheists
English Nobel laureates
English physicists
English people of Scottish descent
Fellows of King's College London
Fellows of the Institute of Physics
Fellows of the Royal Society
Fellows of the Royal Society of Edinburgh
Nobel laureates in Physics
Particle physicists
People educated at the City of London School
People from Wallsend
Theoretical physicists
Wolf Prize in Physics laureates
Members of the Order of the Companions of Honour
J. J. Sakurai Prize for Theoretical Particle Physics recipients
Recipients of the Copley Medal
20th-century atheists
21st-century atheists